Oravec (Czech and Slovak feminine: Oravcová) is a surname. It means native of Orava in Czech and Slovak. Oravec may refer to:
 Ján Oravec (born 1964), Slovak economist
 Marek Oravec (born 1983), Austrian actor
 Matej Oravec (born 1998), Slovak footballer
 Róbert Oravec (born 1994), Slovak footballer
 Roman Oravec (born 1978), Czech athlete
 Tomáš Oravec (born 1980), Slovak footballer

See also
 

Slovak-language surnames
Czech-language surnames
Toponymic surnames